Scott Walker Quessenberry (born March 23, 1995) is an American football guard for the Houston Texans of the National Football League (NFL). He played college football at UCLA.

Professional career

Los Angeles Chargers
Quessenberry was drafted by the Los Angeles Chargers in the fifth round (155th overall) of the 2018 NFL Draft by the Chargers.

Houston Texans
On March 23, 2022, Quessenberry signed with the Houston Texans. He was named the starting center in Week 2, and started the remainder of the season.

On March  13, 2023, Quessenberry re-signed with the Texans.

Personal life
Quessenberry is the younger brother of Buffalo Bills offensive tackle David Quessenberry and Paul Quessenberry, a Tight End for the Houston Texans.

References

External links
Los Angeles Chargers bio

1995 births
Living people
American football centers
American football offensive guards
Los Angeles Chargers players
Sportspeople from Carlsbad, California
UCLA Bruins football players
Players of American football from California
Houston Texans players